Tschandala (old German transcription of chandala) is a term Friedrich Nietzsche borrowed from the Indian caste system, where a chandala is a member of the lowest social class. Nietzsche's interpretation and use of the term relied on a translation of Manusamriti by Max Müller.

Nietzsche's use of the term
Nietzsche uses the term "Tschandala" in the Götzen-Dämmerung (Twilight of the Idols) and Der Antichrist (The Antichrist). Here he uses the "law of Manu" with its caste system as an example of one kind of morality, of "breeding", as opposed to the Christian version of morality which attempts to "tame" man.

At first, Nietzsche describes methods of Christian attempts to "improve" humanity. As a metaphor, he uses a trained beast in a menagerie which is said to be "improved", but which in reality has lost vitality and is only weakened. In just such a way, Nietzsche says, has Christianity "tamed" the Teutonic races.

The law of Manu, on the other hand, tries to organize social groups by creating four castes of people. Nietzsche deplores this type of morality, that of the "breeder", just as he does the (Christian) "animal tamer", as he is opposed to all "morality". However, he much prefers it to the Christian "slave-morality". In his view, the humiliating and oppressive edicts against the Tschandala are a defensive means of keeping the castes pure:

Yet this organization too found it necessary to be terrible—this time not in the struggle with beasts, but with their counter-concept, the unbred man, the mishmash man, the chandala. And again it had no other means for keeping him from being dangerous, for making him weak, than to make him sick—it was the fight with the "great number."

According to Nietzsche, Christianity is a product of Judaism, the "Tschandala-religion". By this he means that Judaism and Christianity after it are the morality born of the hatred of the oppressed (like the Tschandala) for their oppressors:

Christianity, sprung from Jewish roots and comprehensible only as a growth on this soil, represents the counter-movement to any morality of breeding, of race, privilege:—it is the anti-Aryan religion par excellence. Christianity, the revaluation of all Aryan values, the victory of chandala values, the gospel preached to the poor and base, the general revolt of all the downtrodden, the wretched, the failures, the less favored, against "race": the undying chandala hatred as the religion of love...

In The Antichrist, Nietzsche again cites the law of Manu, and favors it in a relative sense to the morality of Judeo-Christianity. Nietzsche describes the "most spiritual" and "strongest" men who can say "yes" to everything, even the existence of the Tschandalas; and opposed to this is the envious and revengeful spirit of the Tschandalas themselves (cf. master–slave morality). Nietzsche also uses the term Tschandala for some of his opponents, e.g. socialism.

Nietzsche's flawed source
Nietzsche's source for the law of Manu was the book Les législateurs religieux. Manou, Moïse, Mahomet (1876) by French writer Louis Jacolliot. According to Annemarie Etter, this translation of the Manusmriti is not reliable and differs widely from other sources. For example, the high respect it gives to women, which Nietzsche quotes in opposition to "Christian misogyny", is in fact not contained in any of the usual texts.

In his description and interpretation of the "Tschandala", Nietzsche may have followed a long footnote by Jacolliot, which gives an "unbelievable, abstruse and scientifically completely untenable" theory. According to Jacolliot, all Semitic peoples, especially the Hebrews, are descendants of emigrated Tschandalas. Although Nietzsche never directly says this, it seems plausible that he believed in Jacolliot's theory at least to some extent, even though, as Etter points out, Nietzsche would have easily been able to falsify several of Jacolliot's pseudo-scientific claims. In so doing, he may have increased the impact of Jacolliot's "effusive admiration for ancient Eastern wisdom and civilization with a more or less open and pronounced antisemitism and antichristianism".

Descendant uses
Though Nietzsche did use the term Übermensch, nowhere in his works does he use the contrary Untermensch that in the 20th century became a notorious concept in the racist Nazi ideology, that was used for races that it perceived "inferior", like Jews, gypsies and Slavs. Nietzsche was not a nationalist, explicitly despised the German culture and also called himself an "anti-antisemite".

Literary influence
Inspired by Nietzsche, August Strindberg wrote a novel called Tschandala in 1889.

Further reading
Koenraad Elst: Manu as a Weapon against Egalitarianism. Nietzsche and Hindu Political Philosophy, in: Siemens, Herman W. / Roodt, Vasti (Hg.): Nietzsche, Power and Politics. Rethinking Nietzsche’s Legacy for Political Thought, Berlin / New York 2008, 543–582.

References

Philosophy of Friedrich Nietzsche
Social concepts
German words and phrases